Abul Hashim (25 January 1905 – 5 October 1974) was a Bangladeshi politician and Islamic thinker in the Indian Subcontinent.

Early life
Hashim was born in a lord family in the village of Kashiara in Purba Bardhaman district of West Bengal. He graduated from Burdwan Raj College in 1928, which was then affiliated with the University of Calcutta,  and earned a law degree in 1931 from the same university. Then he started his law practice at the court of Burdwan.
He was the father of Bangladeshi leftist politician and writer Badruddin Umar.

Political career
He took part in the election to the Bengal Legislative Council in 1936, and participated in the All India Muslim League conference at Allahabad in 1938. He also participated in Muslim League's Lahore conference in 1940. Hashem, a Muslim with a leftist sensibility, opted to pursue his agenda within the Muslim League and, using his family connections, got elected as the general secretary of the Bengal Provincial Muslim League in 1943. In his memoirs, Hashim mentions that at the meeting where he was elected to the post, he was clad in a dhoti. He was critical of Jinnah's vision of East Pakistan, the modern day Bangladesh. The success of the Muslim League soon came through in the 1946 election. He maintained a political proximity with Huseyn Shaheed Suhrawardy and was active in Pakistan Movement.

United Bengal movement
But, he participated in the United Bengal movement in 1947, and on 12 May 1947 he together with Sarat Bose met Mahatma Gandhi to discuss the United Bengal scheme and received his blessings. But the day after, on 13 May 1947, the president of the Indian National Congress, J. B. Kripalani, dismissed any notions to "save the unity of Bengal". In reply to the plea, made by Ashrafuddin Chowdhury, a Muslim nationalist and peasant leader from Tippera, Kripalini wrote: "All that the Congress seeks to do today is to rescue as many areas as possible from the threatened domination of the League and Pakistan. It wants to save as much territory for a Free Indian Union as is possible under the circumstances. It therefore insists upon the division of Bengal and Punjab into areas for Hindustan and Pakistan respectively."

After the partition of India, Hashim became the parliamentary leader of the opposition in West Bengal Provincial Assembly. In 1950 Hashim decided to move to East Pakistan and settled in Dhaka.

Later life and death
In 1940, Hashim began to experience problems with his eyesight, and his condition worsened in 1950 when he became completely blind. Despite this problem, he continued his work in politics, and in 1960, he became the Director of the Islamic Academy. He was also a founding member of Pakistan's Council of Islamic Ideology, a constitutional body established in 1962 by Ayub Khan that exists to this day to advise on the Islamisation of the Pakistani state.

Books
Abul Hashim wrote several books in English and Bengali. Some of his works are:

References

1905 births
1974 deaths
People from Purba Bardhaman district
Pakistan Movement activists from Bengal
University of Calcutta alumni
Bangladeshi politicians
Bangladeshi people of Indian descent